Rainy Lake is a lake in the Moira River and Lake Ontario drainage basins in Addington Highlands, Lennox and Addington County, Ontario, Canada.

The primary inflow, at the west, is Rainy Creek. There are two unnamed creek secondary inflows, both on the north of the lake, one of which comes from Norway Lake. The primary outflow, at the east, is also Rainy Creek, whose waters flow via the Skootamatta River and the Moira River into the Bay of Quinte on Lake Ontario at Belleville.

See also
List of lakes in Ontario

References

Lakes of Lennox and Addington County